Joe Geri (October 20, 1924 – April 20, 2002) was an American Football quarterback-running back who played four seasons for the Pittsburgh Steelers and the Chicago Cardinals from 1949 to 1952 in the National Football League. He was a two time Pro Bowler in 1950 and 1951. He is a member of the Georgia Sports Hall of Fame.

Geri played college football in the University of Georgia and was drafted in the 4th round of the 1949 NFL Draft by the Steelers. Geri also played punter in his short professional career.

References

External links
Career Stats
Joe Geri, 78, All-Pro Steelers Running Back

1924 births
2002 deaths
People from Chester County, Pennsylvania
Players of American football from Pennsylvania
American football quarterbacks
American football running backs
Georgia Bulldogs football players
Pittsburgh Steelers players
Chicago Cardinals players
Eastern Conference Pro Bowl players